Cardillo is a surname of Sicilian origin, derived from the word cardillu, meaning goldfinch.

People with the name
 Alex Cardillo (born 1997), Irish-Canadian actor
 Dom Cardillo (1930–2013), Canadian politician
 Erin Cardillo (born 1977), American actress, producer, and writer
 Mark Cardillo, American scientist
 Rimer Cardillo (born 1944), Uruguayan artist
 Robert Cardillo, American intelligence agency director
 Salvatore Cardillo (1874–1947), Italian-American composer

See also
 Ruth Cardello, American author

References

Surnames of Italian origin